Eragrostis brownii is a widespread species of grass known as Browns lovegrass. Found in Australia and New Zealand, it may be seen growing in woodland or pasture. The specific epithet brownii is named in honour of the Scottish botanist Robert Brown.

References

brownii
Flora of Australia
Flora of New Zealand
Poales of Australia
Plants described in 1840